Daubeney Drue Drury (14 March 1888 – 18 April 1946) was a British fencer. He competed in the team épée event at the 1928 Summer Olympics.

References

1888 births
1946 deaths
British male fencers
Olympic fencers of Great Britain
Fencers at the 1928 Summer Olympics